Genesius may refer to:
Any of several Saints Genesius
Joseph Genesius, tenth-century Byzantine historian
Genesius Theatre in Reading, Pennsylvania